Michael Leonard Brecker (March 29, 1949 – January 13, 2007) was an American jazz saxophonist and composer. He was awarded 15 Grammy Awards as both performer and composer. He was awarded an Honorary Doctorate from Berklee College of Music in 2004, and was inducted into the DownBeat Jazz Hall of Fame in 2007.

Biography

Early life and career
Michael Brecker was born in Philadelphia and raised in Cheltenham Township, a local suburb. He was raised in a Jewish—and artistic—family: his father, Bob (Bobby), was a lawyer who played jazz piano and his mother, Sylvia, was a portrait artist.  Michael Brecker was exposed to jazz at an early age by his father.  Brecker began studying clarinet at age 6, then moved to alto saxophone in eighth grade, settling on the tenor saxophone as his primary instrument in his sophomore year.

He graduated from Cheltenham High School in 1967 and spent that summer at the Berklee College of Music in Boston. In the fall he followed his older brother, Randy, to Indiana University. There he formed a jazz rock group with trumpet player Randy Sandke and others called Mrs. Seamon's Sound Band, named after a dormitory official who disliked longhaired students. The group were finalists in the competition at the Spring 1968 Notre Dame Collegiate Jazz Festival but were disqualified for their interpretation of The Doors song Light My Fire. The band also performed outdoors on campus in a benefit for presidential candidate Eugene McCarthy. Following that semester the band accepted a management offer and moved to Chicago. There, drugs and a love triangle led to a suicide which brought Chicago police to the manager's apartment, where all of the band except Sandke and Brecker (both of whom were not at the scene) were arrested. More trauma followed, and according to Randy Sandke, these events had an adverse psychological impact on Brecker which led to later substance abuse.

During the fall 1968 semester at I.U., Brecker formed a trio (which included the drummer from Mrs. Seamon's Sound Band) and played gigs at a church basement club called The Owl. Some of that was recorded. He dropped out before the end of the semester, spent a month in Mexico City, then returned to Philadelphia where he played with musicians including Eric Gravatt and Billy Paul.

Brecker moved to New York City in 1969, where he carved out a niche for himself as a dynamic and exciting jazz soloist. He first made his mark at age 20 as a member of the jazz-rock band Dreams–a band that included his older brother, trumpeter Randy Brecker, trombonist Barry Rogers, drummer Billy Cobham, keyboardist Jeff Kent and bassist Doug Lubahn. Dreams was short-lived, lasting only from 1969 through 1972, but Miles Davis was seen at some gigs prior to his recording Jack Johnson.

Most of Brecker's early work is marked by an approach informed as much by rock guitar as by R&B saxophone. After Dreams, he worked with Horace Silver and then Billy Cobham before once again teaming up with his brother Randy to form the Brecker Brothers. The band followed jazz-funk trends of the time, but with more attention to structured arrangements, a heavier backbeat, and a stronger rock influence. The band stayed together from 1975 to 1982, with consistent success and musicality. In 1977 he founded the Seventh Avenue South jazz club with his brother Randy.

Sideman and leader
Brecker was in great demand as a soloist and sideman. He performed with bands whose styles ranged from mainstream jazz to mainstream rock. Altogether, he appeared on nearly 900 albums, either as a band member or a guest soloist. He put his stamp on numerous pop and rock recordings as a soloist. His featured guest solos with James Taylor and Paul Simon are examples of that strand of his work. Other notable jazz and rock collaborations included work with Steely Dan, Lou Reed, Donald Fagen, Dire Straits, Joni Mitchell, Eric Clapton, Billy Joel, John Lennon, Aerosmith, Dan Fogelberg, Kenny Loggins, Frank Sinatra, Frank Zappa, Bruce Springsteen, Roger Daltrey, Parliament-Funkadelic, Cameo, Yoko Ono, Todd Rundgren, Chaka Khan, Orleans, Blue Öyster Cult, The Manhattan Transfer, Average White Band, Players Association, Everything but the Girl, Patti Austin, Art Garfunkel, Carly Simon, The Brothers Johnson, Karen Carpenter, and T-Square.

Brecker also recorded or performed with leading jazz figures during his era, including Herbie Hancock, Chick Corea, Hal Galper, Chet Baker, Jan Akkerman, George Benson, Quincy Jones, Charles Mingus, Jaco Pastorius, McCoy Tyner, Pat Metheny, Elvin Jones, Claus Ogerman, Billy Cobham, Horace Silver, Mike Stern, Mike Mainieri, Max Roach, Steps Ahead, Dave Holland, Joey Calderazzo, Kenny Kirkland, Bob James, Grant Green, Don Cherry, Hubert Laws, Don Alias, Larry Goldings, Bob Mintzer, Gary Burton, Yusef Lateef, Steve Gadd, Richard Tee, Dave Brubeck, Charlie Haden, John Abercrombie, Vince Mendoza, Roy Hargrove and Spyro Gyra.

Later career
Brecker played tenor saxophone on two Billy Joel albums. In 1983, Brecker played on three tracks on the album An Innocent Man ("Careless Talk", "Tell Her About It" and "Keeping The Faith"). In 1986, he played on "Big Man on Mulberry Street" on the album The Bridge.

During the early 1980s, he was also a member of NBC's Saturday Night Live Band. Brecker can be seen in the background sporting sunglasses during Eddie Murphy's James Brown parody. After a stint co-leading the all-star group Steps Ahead with Mike Mainieri, Brecker recorded a solo album in 1987. That eponymously titled debut album marked his return to a more traditional jazz setting, highlighting his compositional talents and featuring the EWI (Electronic Wind Instrument), which Brecker had previously played with Steps Ahead. In 1987 he featured his new solo album at the JVC Newport Jazz Festival, incorporating the EWI.
Brecker continued to record albums as a leader throughout the 1990s and 2000s, winning multiple Grammy Awards.

He went on tour in 2001 with a collaborative group, Hancock-Brecker-Hargrove. This tour was dedicated to jazz pioneers John Coltrane and Miles Davis. Brecker paid homage to Coltrane by performing Coltrane's signature piece, "Naima". The concert CD from the tour, Directions in Music: Live At Massey Hall (2002), won a Grammy in 2003.

Illness and death
While performing at the Mount Fuji Jazz Festival in 2004, Brecker experienced a sharp pain in his back. Shortly thereafter in 2005, he was diagnosed with the blood disorder myelodysplastic syndrome (MDS). Despite a widely publicized worldwide search, Brecker was unable to find a matching stem cell donor. In late 2005, he was the recipient of an experimental partial matching stem cell transplant. By late 2006, he appeared to be recovering, but the treatment proved not to be a cure. He made his final public performance on June 23, 2006, playing with Hancock at Carnegie Hall. Brecker died from complications of leukemia in a Manhattan hospital. His funeral was held on January 15, 2007, in Hastings-on-Hudson, New York.

Instruments
Early in his career, Brecker played a Selmer Super Balanced Action saxophone (serial number 39xxx), later moving to a lacquer-finished Selmer Mark VI tenor saxophone (serial number 86351, manufactured in 1960) with silver-plated neck (serial number 92203), fitted with a Dave Guardala MB1 mouthpiece and LaVoz medium reeds. His earlier mouthpieces included a metal Otto Link 'New York' STM (during the mid-1970s) and a metal Dukoff in the late 1970s and early 1980s.

Brecker also played the drums as he often talked about time, or rhythm, being musically the most important. He displayed his drum prowess during shows with his own ensembles or accompanying students during masterclasses.

Legacy

On February 11, 2007, Brecker was awarded two posthumous Grammy awards for his involvement on his brother Randy's 2005 album Some Skunk Funk.

On May 22, 2007, his final recording, Pilgrimage, was released and received a good critical response. It was recorded in August 2006 with Pat Metheny on guitar, John Patitucci on bass, Jack DeJohnette on drums and Herbie Hancock and Brad Mehldau on piano. Brecker was critically ill when it was recorded, but the other musicians involved praised the standard of his musicianship. Brecker was again posthumously awarded two additional Grammy Awards for this album in the categories of Best Jazz Instrumental Solo and Best Jazz Instrumental Album, Individual or Group, bringing his Grammy total to 15.

Brecker's search in the International Bone Marrow Registry for a match prompted his wife and manager to organize a series of bone marrow drives throughout the world, including the Red Sea, Monterey, and Newport Jazz Festivals. Brecker was subsequently featured in a film directed by Noah Hutton (son of Debra Winger and Timothy Hutton), named More to Live For. It documents Brecker's battle with leukemia, and the production of his final recording. By going public with his illness, Brecker raised tens of thousands of dollars for testing, and signed up many thousands of donors, but was unable to find a match for himself.

Herbie Hancock said that around nine months before his death, Brecker had started practicing Buddhism and three months later joined Soka Gakkai International, a group associated with Nichiren Buddhism. At Brecker's memorial service, Hancock, Wayne Shorter and Buster Williams (who all practice the same form of Buddhism) as well as Brecker's son, Sam, sat in a line with their backs to the audience while facing an inscribed scroll (Gohonzon) hanging in a wooden shrine (Butsudan) and chanted, "Nam myoho renge kyo" for five minutes.

Brecker's widow Susan organized two benefit concerts, the first in 2015 and the latter in 2017.  The events were dubbed "The Nearness of You" concert and were held at Jazz at Lincoln Center's Appel Room. The concerts aimed to support cancer research at Columbia University Medical Center (CUMC) and the work of doctors Azra Raza and Siddhartha Mukherjee.  Guest performers included James Taylor, Paul Simon, Chaka Khan, Randy Brecker, Dianne Reeves, Bobby McFerrin, Diana Krall, Wynton Marsalis, Will Lee, Gil Goldstein, Antonio Sanchez, John Patitucci, Adam Rogers, Mike Mainieri, Andy Snitzer, Jack DeJohnette, Chase Baird, Jeff "Tain" Watts, Robert Glasper, Dave Liebman, Joe Lovano, Ravi Coltrane, Nir Felder, Eli Degibri and others.

The Michael Brecker Archive was established in 2013 at William Paterson University in Wayne, New Jersey, in collaboration with Susan Brecker, and Randy Brecker acting as advisor. The archive contains: original pencil and ink tune manuscripts covering Brecker's solo career and collaborations with Elvin Jones, Pat Metheny, Paul Simon, Horace Silver, Herbie Hancock, Chick Corea and others; three EWIs; mouthpieces, reeds and other equipment; over 250 commercially released LPs and CDs; over 1200 hours of unreleased live recordings and studio mixes on cassettes, DATs and other digital media; nine practice journals spanning from Brecker's time at Indiana University to the late 1990s; music books from his personal collection; an extensive clippings file; business materials; tour itineraries and record company/tour promotional materials; and over 1500 unreleased photo images.

Selected discography

As leader or co-leader
 1975: The Brecker Bros. with the Brecker Brothers
 1976: Back to Back with the Brecker Brothers
 1976: Don't Stop the Music with the Brecker Brothers
 1978: Heavy Metal Be-Bop with the Brecker Brothers
 1980: Detente with the Brecker Brothers
 1981: Straphangin' with the Brecker Brothers
 1982: Cityscape (Michael Brecker and Claus Ogerman) with Marcus Miller, Eddie Gómez, Steve Gadd and Paulinho da Costa
 1983: Steps Ahead with Mike Mainieri, Eddie Gómez, Peter Erskine, and Eliane Elias
 1984: Modern Times with Mike Mainieri, Eddie Gómez, Peter Erskine, Warren Bernhardt, and Chuck Loeb
 1986: Magnetic with Steps Ahead, inc. Victor Bailey, Mike Mainieri, Peter Erskine, Chuck Loeb, Kenny Kirkland, Hiram Bullock, Paul Jackson, Peter Schwimmer, Mitchel Forman and Diane Reeves
 1987: Michael Brecker with Pat Metheny, Kenny Kirkland, Charlie Haden, and Jack DeJohnette
 1988: Don't Try This at Home
 1990: Now You See It… (Now You Don't)
 1992: Return of the Brecker Brothers with the Brecker Brothers
 1994: Out of the Loop with the Brecker Brothers
 1996: Tales from the Hudson with Pat Metheny, Joey Calderazzo, McCoy Tyner, Dave Holland, Jack DeJohnette and Don Alias
 1998: Two Blocks from the Edge with Joey Calderazzo, James Genus, Jeff "Tain" Watts, and Don Alias
 1999: Time Is of the Essence with Larry Goldings, Pat Metheny, Elvin Jones, Jeff "Tain" Watts, and Bill Stewart
 2001: Nearness Of You: The Ballad Book with Pat Metheny, Herbie Hancock, Charlie Haden, Jack DeJohnette, James Taylor
 2003: Wide Angles
 2007: Some Skunk Funk with Randy Brecker
 2007: Pilgrimage with John Patitucci, Jack DeJohnette, Pat Metheny, Herbie Hancock, and Brad Mehldau

As sideman

 1969 Score – Randy Brecker
 1970 Dreams – Dreams
 1971 Air – Air
 1971 Imagine My Surprise – Dreams
 1971 The Guerilla Band – Hal Galper (Mainstream)
 1972 Wild Bird – Hal Galper (Mainstream)
 1972 Bridging a Gap – Mark Murphy (Muse)
 1972 One Man Dog – James Taylor
 1972 Something/Anything? – Todd Rundgren
 1973 Berlin – Lou Reed
 1973 A Wizard, a True Star – Todd Rundgren
 1973 Mind Games – John Lennon
 1973 In Pursuit of the 27th Man – Horace Silver
 1974 Todd – Todd Rundgren
 1974 The Chicago Theme – Hubert Laws (CTI)
 1974 Crosswinds – Billy Cobham (Atlantic)
 1974 Journey – Arif Mardin (Atlantic)
 1974 Hotcakes – Carly Simon
 1974 Walking Man – James Taylor
 1974 Get Your Wings – Aerosmith (Columbia)
 1974 It's Always Dark Before the Dawn' – Jonah (20th Century Records)
 1974 Waitin' for the Change – Jonah (20th Century Records)
 1975 The Rape of El Morro – Don Sebesky (CTI)
 1975 Good King Bad – George Benson (CTI)
 1975 Shabazz – Billy Cobham
 1975 A Funky Thide of Sings – Billy Cobham
 1975 Still Crazy After All These Years – Paul Simon
 1975 Mothership Connection – Parliament
 1975 Born to Run – Bruce Springsteen
 1976 The Main Attraction – Grant Green (Kudu)
 1976 Tring-a-Ling – Joanne Brackeen
 1976 End of a Rainbow – Patti Austin
 1976 The Art of Tea – Michael Franks
 1976 Songs for the New Depression – Bette Midler
 1976 Ringo's Rotogravure – Ringo Starr
 1976 Blue Moves – Elton John
 1976 Smile – Laura Nyro
 1976 In the Pocket – James Taylor
 1976 Good King Bad – George Benson
 1976 Jaco Pastorius - Jaco Pastorius
 1976 Hear & Now – Don Cherry
 1976 Reach Out! – Hal Galper (SteepleChase)
 1976 Red Beans - Jimmy McGriff (Groove Merchant)
 1977 Mel Lewis and Friends −  Mel Lewis (A&M/Horizon)
 1977 Ghost Writer – Garland Jeffreys
 1977 Havana Candy – Patti Austin
1977 "Live at the Berlin Philharmonic" – Hal Galper
 1977 Tightrope – Steve Khan
 1977 Sleeping Gypsy – Michael Franks
 1977 Lady Put the Light Out – Frankie Valli
 1977 You Can't Live Without It – Jack Wilkins
 1977 Never Letting Go – Phoebe Snow
 1977 Ghost Writer – Garland Jeffreys
 1977 Ringo the 4th – Ringo Starr
 1977 You Can't Go Home Again – Chet Baker
 1977 The Best Thing for You – Chet Baker
 1978 Zappa in New York – Frank Zappa
 1978 Love Explosion – Tina Turner
 1978 The Blue Man – Steve Khan
 1978 Phonogenic – Not Just Another Pretty Face – Melanie
 1978 Double Fun – Robert Palmer
 1978 Against the Grain – Phoebe Snow
 1978 One-Eyed Jack – Garland Jeffreys
 1978 Chaka – Chaka Khan
 1978 Boys in the Trees – Carly Simon
 1978 Clayton – David Clayton-Thomas
 1978 Live at the Bottom Line – Patti Austin
 1978 Merge – Jack Wilkins
 1979 Shadows and Light – Joni Mitchell with Pat Metheny, Jaco Pastorius, Lyle Mays and Don Alias
 1979 In a Temple Garden – Yusef Lateef
 1979 Arrows – Steve Khan
 1979 Keep the Fire – Kenny Loggins
 1979 Spy – Carly Simon
 1979 Thighs and Whispers – Bette Midler
 1979 In Out and Around – Mike Nock Quartet with Mike Nock (p), Michael Brecker (ts) and Al Foster (d)
 1979 Fate for Breakfast – Art Garfunkel
 1979 Cheryl Lynn – Cheryl Lynn
 1979 Casiopea – Casiopea
 1980 Gaucho – Steely Dan
 1980 To Chi Ka – Kazumi Watanabe (Columbia)
 1980 Body Language – Patti Austin
 1980 Aretha – Aretha Franklin
 1980 Naughty – Chaka Khan
 1980 80/81 – Pat Metheny
 1980 Candi Staton – Candi Staton
 1981 Escape Artist – Garland Jeffreys
 1981 Scissors Cut – Art Garfunkel
 1981 Word of Mouth - Jaco Pastorius
 1981 Torch – Carly Simon
 1981 The Innocent Age – Dan Fogelberg
 1981 Three Quartets – Chick Corea
 1981 Season of Glass – Yoko Ono
 1982 The Nightfly – Donald Fagen
 1982 Objects of Desire – Michael Franks
 1983 Pacific Fire – George Benson
 1983 In My Life – Patti Austin
 1983 Hello Big Man – Carly Simon
 1983 In Your Eyes – George Benson
 1983 Emergency – Melissa Manchester
 1983 Wins – Franco Ambrosetti (Enja)
 1983 An Innocent Man – Billy Joel
 1983 Fast Emotion – UZEB
 1984 Valotte – Julian Lennon
 1984 New Sensations – Lou Reed
 1984 L.A. Is My Lady – Frank Sinatra
 1984 Night – John Abercrombie
 1985 Brothers in Arms – Dire Straits
 1985 Tentets – Franco Ambrosetti (Enja)
 1985 That's Why I'm Here – James Taylor
 1985 Gettin' Away with Murder – Patti Austin
 1985 Amanda – Eliane Elias and Randy Brecker
 1985 Mezgo – Eddie Gómez
 1985 Skin Dive – Michael Franks
 1986 The Bridge – Billy Joel
 1986 August – Eric Clapton
 1986 Destiny – Chaka Khan
 1986 A House Full of Love – Grover Washington Jr.
 1986 Gil Evans and His Orchestra with Gil Evans and His Orchestra  – VHS, later DVD-Video in 2007
 1986 Hearts and Numbers – Don Grolnick
 1987 Exiles – Dan Fogelberg
 1987 The Camera Never Lies – Michael Franks
 1987 Coming Around Again – Carly Simon
 1988 Times Like These – Gary Burton
 1988 Getting There – John Abercrombie
 1988 Patti Austin – Patti Austin
 1988 Lefty – Art Garfunkel
 1988 Time in Place - Mike Stern
 1988 Never Die Young – James Taylor
 1989 Soul Provider – Michael Bolton
 1989 City Streets – Carole King
 1989 So Far So Close – Eliane Elias
 1990 The Language of Life – Everything but the Girl
 1990 Have You Seen Me Lately – Carly Simon
 1990 The Rhythm of the Saints – Paul Simon
 1990 Master Plan – Dave Weckl
 1990 My Romance – Carly Simon
 1991 New Moon Shine – James Taylor
 1991 I'm on Your Side – Jennifer Holliday
 1991 Don't Call Me Buckwheat – Garland Jeffreys
 1993 Walk the Dog and Light the Light – Laura Nyro
 1994 Crossings – Steve Khan
 1994 SMAP 006: Sexy Six - SMAP (Victor)
 1995 Young Lions & Old Tigers – Dave Brubeck (Telarc)
 1995 Infinity – McCoy Tyner (Impulse!)
 1995 Strength –  (Sony)
 1995 Beauty and Harmony – Miwa Yoshida (Epic/Sony)
 1995 Abandoned Garden – Michael Franks
 1996 The New Standard – Herbie Hancock (Verve)
 1996 Across America – Art Garfunkel
 1996 Stardust – Natalie Cole
 1996 Wilderness – Tony Williams
 1996 Merge – Jack Wilkins with Randy Brecker, recorded in 1977
 1996 Village – Wallace Roney
 1997 West Side Story – Dave Grusin
 1997 Give and Take – Mike Stern
 1997 Hourglass – James Taylor
 1997 A Story – Yoko Ono
 1998 Eliane Elias Sings Jobim – Eliane Elias
 1999 The Truth: Heard Live at the Blue Note – Elvin Jones (Half Note)
 1999 Timeless: The Classics Vol. 2 – Michael Bolton
 1999 Barefoot on the Beach – Michael Franks
 1999 What It Is – Jacky Terrasson
 2000 "Cyrus Chestnut and Friends: A Charlie Brown Christmas" with Cyrus Chestnut
 2001 Reunion – Jack Wilkins with Randy Brecker
 2001 Drum'n voice (All that Groove) – Billy Cobham [Nicolosi Productions]
 2002 Rendezvous in New York with Chick Corea's Three Quartets Band
 2002 American Dreams with Charlie Haden
 2002 October Road – James Taylor
 2003 Louis Bellson and His Big Band with Michael Brecker, Randy Brecker, Herb Geller, Benny Bailey, Howard Johnson, and Lew Soloff
 2003 Nature Boy: The Standards Album – Aaron Neville
 2004 Dreamer – Eliane Elias
 2004 The Passage Andy Narell – Song for Mia Solo
 2004 Live from the Village Vanguard, Vol. 3 with the John Abercrombie Quartet
 2004 Horacio Hernandez: Live at the Modern Drummer Festival with Marc Quiñones, Michael Brecker, John Patitucci, and Hilario Durán
 2005 Listen Here! with Eddie Palmieri
 2005 In The Now'' – Darren Kramer Organization

References

External links
Official site
Live recordings
Complete Discography
Lucky Link To Old Site
an archive of Clark Terry, Michael Brecker, Thad Jones, James Williams and Mulgrew Miller Michael Brecker Archive

1949 births
2007 deaths
Deaths from myelodysplastic syndrome
People from Montgomery County, Pennsylvania
American funk saxophonists
American male saxophonists
American session musicians
Post-bop saxophonists
Mainstream jazz saxophonists
Jazz fusion saxophonists
Grammy Award winners
Deaths from leukemia
Musicians from Philadelphia
P-Funk members
Saturday Night Live Band members
Jazz tenor saxophonists
American jazz tenor saxophonists
People from Cheltenham, Pennsylvania
Plastic Ono Band members
Deaths from cancer in New York (state)
Verve Records artists
20th-century saxophonists
Jazz musicians from Pennsylvania
American male jazz musicians
Steps Ahead members
Dreams (band) members
White Elephant Orchestra members
Members Only (band) members
20th-century American male musicians